Jara is a village near Bhuj in Kutch district of Gujarat, India.

History
At the foot of a hill of Jara, there was a battle (1762) in which Mian Ghulam Shah Kalhoro of Sindh defeated and destroyed the army of Cutch State.

References

 This article incorporates Public Domain text from 

Villages in Kutch district
History of Kutch